The Van's RV-8 is a tandem two-seat, single-engine, low-wing homebuilt aircraft sold in kit form by Van's Aircraft.  The RV-8 is equipped with conventional landing gear, while the RV-8A version features tricycle landing gear. The design is similar to the earlier RV-4, although it is larger than that earlier model.

Development
Richard VanGrunsven designed the RV-8 series as an updated, larger tandem aircraft based on the RV-4 design concept. The RV-8 first flew in 1995 and was first shown publicly at Oshkosh that year.

The RV-8 incorporated changes as a result of lessons learned in producing the popular RV-4 design. The RV-8 also has increased wingspan and wing area over the RV-4, as well as greater cockpit width, headroom, legroom and an increased useful load, all with a view to accommodating larger pilots. Like the RV-3 to RV-7 that preceded it, the RV-8 is stressed for aerobatics.

The RV-8 series was intended from inception to include a nose-gear-equipped version designated the RV-8A. The RV-8A was first flown in 1998

As of November 2022, 1,611 RV-8s and RV-8As have been completed and flown.

Specifications (RV-8)

See also

References

External links

 
 How the RV-8 Came to Be - AVweb

Homebuilt aircraft
1990s United States civil utility aircraft
RV-08
Low-wing aircraft
Single-engined tractor aircraft
Aircraft first flown in 1995